Qaraqaşlı (also, Karakashly) is a village and municipality in the Imishli Rayon of Azerbaijan.  It has a population of 1,298.

References 

Populated places in Imishli District